Sergei Dmitrievich Orekhov (sometimes spelled: Sergey Dmitrievich Orehov) (in Russian: Сергей Дмитриевич Орехов) (1935–1998) was a Russian classical guitarist. A virtuoso on both the six- and seven-string guitars, Orekhov was among the most prominent performers and arrangers in the seven-string Russian guitar tradition.

Recordings
Гитара семиструнная - Seven-Stringed Guitar with Sergei Orekhov and Alexei Perfiliev (Алексей Перфильев);  (1985, Мелодия С20 24391 00)

Guitars used by Orekhov
Among the guitars used by Orekhov, one finds
Johann Gottfried Scherzer 1861This guitar has a detachable neck. Its original neck has a configuration for 10 strings. Orekhov used a neck with the Russian 7-string configuration.

References

External links
Biography (encyclopaedia-music.narod.ru) 
Biography (www.ozon.ru) 
Biography (www.abc-guitars.com) 
Biography (www.romansy.ru) 
Audio Files (mp3) 

Russian classical guitarists
Russian male guitarists
1935 births
1998 deaths
Seven-string guitarists
20th-century classical musicians
20th-century guitarists
20th-century Russian male musicians